Peter Overend Watts (13 May 1947 – 22 January 2017) was an English bass guitar player and founding member of the 1970s rock band Mott the Hoople.

Early life
Watts was born in Yardley, Birmingham, on 13 May 1947. He moved as a child to Worthing, Sussex, and then to Ross-on-Wye, Herefordshire, where he started learning guitar while at Ross Grammar School. His middle name, Overend (which initially he did not use), came from that of a family ancestor.

Career
Watts began playing the guitar at the age of 13 and by 1965, he had switched to bass guitar, and became a professional musician alongside Mick Ralphs in a group, the Buddies, that played in German clubs. The group later became the Doc Thomas Group, and then Shakedown Sound, before finally changing their name to Silence and settling in London in 1969. The group then added singer Ian Hunter, became Mott the Hoople, and, taking the advice of manager Guy Stevens, Pete Watts adopted the stage name Overend Watts.
Following the departure of Ian Hunter and Mick Ronson from the band, in 1974, the remaining members of Mott the Hoople recruited relative unknowns Ray Major, on guitar, and Nigel Benjamin, on vocals. The name was abbreviated to Mott and a further two albums, Drive On (1975) and Shouting and Pointing (1976), were recorded with this line-up, before Benjamin quit.

Watts continued, with Dale "Buffin" Griffin, Morgan Fisher and Ray Major, in the Mott successor British Lions, recruiting former Medicine Head member John Fiddler. They released the albums British Lions, which reached No. 83 in the US (1977), and Trouble with Women (1982). He later became a record producer, producing albums for artists including Hanoi Rocks and Dumb Blondes.

Watts's bass of choice was a white Gibson Thunderbird, one of which was later sold to Wishbone Ash bassist Martin Turner.

Later career
In January 2009 it was confirmed that Watts and the other original members of Mott the Hoople would reform for three 40th anniversary reunion concerts in October 2009. The reunion at the HMV Hammersmith Apollo, London, England was extended to five shows due to popular demand.

In August 2009 American rock music group Mambo Sons released their double album Heavy Days featuring a song in tribute to him entitled "Overend Watts".   

In November 2013 Mott the Hoople again reunited, with Martin Chambers once again sitting in (for an ailing Buffin) on drums, for a series of UK gigs in Birmingham, Glasgow, Newcastle and Manchester, before concluding at the o2 in London.

Before his death in 2017 Watts finally completed his solo album that he had been promising to deliver to his legion of fans for the past decade plus. In keeping with his legendary witty humour, he decreed that as the album would be released after his passing it would not be called “She’s Real Gone” as planned but changed to “He’s Real Gone.”

Death
Watts died on 22 January 2017 from throat cancer at the age of 69.

Publication
Watts was known for his long-distance walks. His book, The Man Who Hated Walking, was published in 2013.

References

1947 births
2017 deaths
English bass guitarists
English male guitarists
Male bass guitarists
English record producers
Musicians from Birmingham, West Midlands
Mott the Hoople members
Glam rock musicians
People from Yardley
Deaths from throat cancer
Deaths from cancer in England
British Lions (band) members